In mathematics, the Wielandt theorem characterizes the gamma function, defined for all complex numbers  for which  by

as the only function  defined on the half-plane  such that:
 ;
  for all  and
  is bounded on the strip .
This theorem named after the mathematician Helmut Wielandt.

See also 
 Bohr–Mollerup theorem
 Hadamard's gamma function

Reference 
 .

Gamma and related functions
Theorems in complex analysis